Benjamin Winkler (May 25, 1902 – February 22, 1979) was an American sound engineer and recordist in the U.S. film industry having some 135 credits to his name. Born in The Bronx, New York. His film credits included Money Madness, D.O.A., The Texan Meets Calamity Jane, The Jackie Robinson Story and Doctor Jim. Winkler died in February 1979 in Pacific Palisades, California, at the age of 76.

References

External links 

1902 births
1979 deaths
American audio engineers
People from Pacific Palisades, California
People from the Bronx
Engineers from New York City
Engineers from California
20th-century American engineers